Ali Omar Ermes (Arabic:علي عمر الرميص, born 1945) was a Libyan artist and author. His paintings make use of Arabic calligraphy, often superimposed on a rich-textured ground, and may incorporate fragments of Arabic or other poetry or prose. He had lived in the United Kingdom since 1981, and was the chairman of the Muslim Cultural Heritage Centre in Kensington in west London; he was also active in other intellectual and cultural institutions in that city.

Biography 

Ermes was born in Zliten in Libya in 1945. He studied at the University of Plymouth School of Architecture and Design in Plymouth in south-west England, and after his graduation in 1970 returned to Libya. There he wrote extensively and headed the visual arts section of All Arts magazine. In 1974 he was engaged as a "visual arts consultant" for the World of Islam Festival held in London in 1976, and visited many Islamic countries to identify possible participants in the festival. From 1981 he lived in the United Kingdom. Ermes has participated in various Muslim community projects, written about many important issues and has exhibited in some sixty to seventy exhibitions around the world.

Exhibitions 

Ermes has shown work at the State Hermitage, St Petersburg, Russia (November 2007); the Fowler Museum of the University of California, Los Angeles, USA (October 2007/8); the National Museum of African Art of the Smithsonian Institution, USA (May 2007); Word into Art at the British Museum in London, and later Dubai (2006 and 2008); East-West: Objects Between Culture at Tate Britain (September 2006/7) and Dubai International Financial Centre, Dubai (March 2008).

 References 
also the publication Signs of Our Times, From Calligraphy to Calligrafitti, edited  by Rose Issa, Merrill publications, London 2016

 Further reading 

 M. Richardson (1988). The Alphabet of Ali Omar Ermes. Arts and the Islamic World 4 (4): 33–36
 V. Porter (2006). Word into Art: Artists of the Modern Middle East (exhibition catalogue). London: British Museum, no. 18.
 Christine Mullen Kreamer, Mary Nooter Roberts, Elizabeth Harney, Allyson Purpura (2007). Inscribing Meaning: Writing and Graphic Systems in African Art. African Arts 40 (3): 78–91.  .
 Reem Abdelhadi, Luma Hameed, Fatima Khaled, Jim Anderson (2019). Creative interactions with art works: an engaging approach to Arabic language-and-culture learning. Innovation in Language Learning and Teaching''. . .

Articles in Arabic 

Ali Omar Ermes - A link between Art and Literature - Arabic article
جماليات الحرف العربي بخلفية ثقافية أصيلة.. غالية الثمن
انتقال الفنان العربي «علي عمر الرميص» إلى العالمية
علي الرميص في دار الفنون: كل حرف هو صورة تجريدية
الفنان العالمي الليبي علي الرميص ينادي بالسلام بحروف عربية
بحضور شخصيات إسلامية وعدد من السفراءالأمير شارلز افتتح المركز الثقافي الإسلامي بلندن
علي الرميص يرسم الحروف ويرفض مسخ الطبيعة
علي الرميص يصور الكلمة العربية في سياق إنساني
Ali Omar Ermes’ exhibition in Mayfair, London, Arabic article
Ali Omar Ermes and the Arabic Letterform – Arabic article

Articles by Ali Omar Ermes in Arabic
The importance of the Arabic Language
Al Arab fil Gharab Part 1
Al Arab fil Gharab Part 2
The Arab media Part 1
The Arab media Part 2

1945 births
Libyan Muslims
Libyan painters
20th-century British painters
British male painters
21st-century British painters
British Muslims
Islam in Europe
English people of Libyan descent
Living people
Libyan emigrants to the United Kingdom
Alumni of the Central School of Art and Design
Libyan artists
Libyan contemporary artists
20th-century British male artists
21st-century British male artists